The 1982 European Cup final was played on 26 May 1982. Football League First Division winners Aston Villa defeated Bundesliga winners Bayern Munich 1–0 at De Kuip in Rotterdam, Netherlands to win the European Cup for the first time, and continue the streak of English teams winning the competition, being the sixth consecutive victory by an English side.

Route to the final

Match

Summary

After 10 minutes, goalkeeper Jimmy Rimmer suffered a repeat of a recurring shoulder injury. His replacement, Nigel Spink, subsequently made his second first team appearance for the club. His performance in helping prevent Bayern from scoring throughout the match was subsequently highly praised, and is seen by many as the making of a player who would be Villa's first choice goalkeeper for the following 10 seasons.	

Bayern Munich did find the net with three minutes of play remaining, although the goal was ruled offside. Villa also got the ball in the net for a second time a few seconds before the end of the match but this goal was also disallowed.

Brian Moore's commentary of the winning goal is displayed on a giant banner across the North Stand of Villa Park:

As defending European champions, Villa were invited into the European Cup, European Super Cup and the Intercontinental Cup for the following season. Their defence of the European Cup ended in a quarter-final defeat to a Juventus. They beat Barcelona 3–1 on aggregate to win the Super Cup, but lost 2–0 to Uruguayan club Peñarol for the Intercontinental Cup in Tokyo, Japan.

Details

See also
1981–82 Aston Villa F.C. season
1981–82 European Cup
FC Bayern Munich in international football competitions

References

External links
1981–82 season at UEFA website

1
Aston Villa F.C. matches
FC Bayern Munich matches
1982
1981–82 in Dutch football
International club association football competitions hosted by the Netherlands
1981–82 in German football
1981–82 in English football
May 1982 sports events in Europe
20th century in Rotterdam
Sports competitions in Rotterdam